Franco Sar (21 December 1933 – 1 October 2018) was an Italian decathlete who held the national title from 1960–65.

Biography
Sar competed at the 1960 and 1964 Summer Olympics and placed sixth and thirteenth, respectively.

Achievements

National titles
He won 9 national championships at individual senior level.
Italian Athletics Championships
Decathlon: From 1958 to 1965 (8)
Pole vault: 1963

References

External links
 

1933 births
2018 deaths
Olympic athletes of Italy
Athletes (track and field) at the 1960 Summer Olympics
Athletes (track and field) at the 1964 Summer Olympics
Italian decathletes
Italian male pole vaulters